Sandra Bernhard (born June 6, 1955) is an American actress, singer, comedian and author. She first gained attention in the late 1970s with her stand-up comedy, where she often critiqued celebrity culture and political figures.

She is perhaps best known for portraying Nancy Bartlett Thomas on the ABC sitcom Roseanne from the fourth season (1991) to the end of the show in 1997. She played Nurse Judy Kubrak in the FX drama series Pose. She is number 96 on Comedy Central's list of the 100 greatest stand-ups of all time.

Early life
Bernhard was born June 6, 1955, in Flint, Michigan, the daughter of Jeanette (née LaZebnik) and proctologist Jerome Bernhard. Her parents raised her as a Conservative Jew.

In 1973 she traveled to Israel and stayed for 7 months at Kibbutz Kfar Menahem with her friend Daniel Chick. She later returned to Israel during the Yom Kippur War. 

She has three older brothers: Dan, David and Mark. Her family moved to Arizona when she was 10. She attended Saguaro High School in Scottsdale, graduating in 1973.

Career
Bernhard became a staple at The Comedy Store. As her popularity as a comedian grew, she was cast as a supporting player on The Richard Pryor Show in 1977. Guest appearances on evening talk shows followed. Her big break came in 1983 when she was cast by Martin Scorsese to star as stalker/kidnapper Masha in the film The King of Comedy, for which she won the National Society of Film Critics Award for Best Supporting Actress. She was a frequent guest on David Letterman's NBC program Late Night with David Letterman, making 28 appearances starting in 1983.

She began performing her first one-woman show, I'm Your Woman, in 1985, and an album version was released. She appeared in a variety of small television roles throughout the 1980s while crafting her stand-up routine into a more performance art-oriented show. She launched an off-Broadway one-woman show called Without You, I'm Nothing, With You, I'm Not Much Better in 1988, which played at the Orpheum Theatre. In 1990, it was turned into a film and a double album of the same title. The film was mostly shot on location in 1989 in the Cocoanut Grove nightclub at the Ambassador Hotel.

It was during the run of Without You, I'm Nothing, With You, I'm Not Much Better that Bernhard appeared with her then good friend (and rumored lover) Madonna on a 1988 episode of Late Night with David Letterman. The two alluded to their romantic relationship and staged a sexy confrontation; the appearance received much publicity. They continued to be friends for several years, with Bernhard making an appearance in Madonna's film Truth or Dare.

In 1991, Bernhard began playing Nancy Bartlett on the hit sitcom Roseanne. She appeared in 33 episodes between 1991 and 1997, and was one of the first actresses to portray an openly bisexual recurring character on American television. In September 1992, Bernhard did a nude pictorial for Playboy. She hosted the USA Network's Reel Wild Cinema for two seasons beginning in 1995. She continued acting in mostly independent films, TV guest roles, and forays into mainstream films such as Hudson Hawk and Dallas Doll. In 1991, she released her first studio album, Excuses for Bad Behavior (Part One). In 1995, she briefly appeared as a guest in the "Jerk" episode of the animated talk show Space Ghost Coast to Coast. In 1996, she guest-starred on an episode of Highlander: The Series called "Dramatic License", where she played a romance novelist writing about the life of the main character.

She appeared as herself on Will & Grace, in an episode where the title characters spuriously bid on Bernhard's Manhattan apartment in an attempt to become friendly with her. When their ruse is exposed, Bernhard rants at them, with the sounds of a blender (she was having a smoothie made) blotting out supposed obscenities. She briefly returned as herself two years later.

Bernhard returned to Broadway in 1998 with the show I'm Still Here... Damn It!, recorded for a live comedy album. She was pregnant at the time, and gave birth to daughter Cicely Yasin Bernhard on July 4, 1998. She returned to New York in 2006 with the off-Broadway show Everything Bad & Beautiful. The CD of the show, released by indie label Breaking Records, was lauded as one of her best. That year she also hosted the first season of the reality competition show The Search for the Funniest mother in America on Nick at Nite. 2007 saw the debut of her one-woman show Plan B from Outer Space, and the inclusion of her Hanukkah-themed song "Miracle of Lights", which she co-wrote with Mitchell Kaplan, in the Breaking Records compilation album Breaking For the Holidays. She toured Plan B through 2008 and performed "Miracle of Lights" on some morning shows in New York.

Bernhard was a featured guest singer with children's artist Dan Zanes on the Family Dance album's "Thrift Shop". In an interview with Howard Stern, she revealed that she was originally offered the role of Miranda Hobbes on the TV show Sex and the City, but opted out owing to the "terrible" original script and small paycheck. In 2013, it was announced that she would join the cast of ABC Family's Switched at Birth with Glees Max Adler, where she would play an art professor on the season 3 opener in January 2014. In 2015, she began hosting a radio show, Sandyland, on Sirius XM's Radio Andy.

In 2015, she made her first appearance as the recurring character of Joedth ("Joe") in season 4 of 2 Broke Girls. From 2018 until 2021, she played Nurse Judy on FX's POSE, a show based on queer and trans ball culture in Manhattan inspired by the documentary Paris Is Burning.

Public controversies
In 1995, while serving as a guest panelist on the Comedy Central talk show Politically Incorrect, Bernhard became engaged in an argument with fellow panelist, conservative political commentator John Lofton. Bernhard then stood up and spat at Lofton and excaimed, "If I had you, you’d be an abortion."

In August 2006, Bernhard served as the spokesperson in a commercial for Make-up Art Cosmetics (MAC). In the commercial, promoting PlushGlass lipgloss, she referred to someone who might not approve of her outspokenness as a "little freaked out, intimidated, frightened, right-wing Republican thin-lipped bitch". MAC edited the line from the commercial to avoid unintentionally offending some of its customers.

In September 2008, she warned vice-presidential candidate Sarah Palin that she would be gang-raped by her "big black brothers" if she visited Manhattan. Palin had a campaign stop planned in New York City at the time.

In November 2020, during an interview with Mariah Carey, Naomi Campbell called out Bernhard for her comments about Carey and Black men in her 1998 comedy show I'm Still Here… Damn It! In the show, Bernhard disparaged Carey's Black ancestry, saying "She's trying to backtrack on our asses by acting real nigger-ish there at the Royalton Hotel suite with Puff Daddy and all the greasy, chain-wearing Black men."

Personal life
Bernhard identifies as bisexual and is a strong supporter of LGBT rights. On July 4, 1998, she gave birth to a daughter, whom she raised with Sara Switzer, her partner of over 20 years.

Music
Bernhard performs classic pop music, jazz, and blues tunes. She has released several albums (combinations of music and comedy).

Albums
 I'm Your Woman
 Without You I'm Nothing
 Excuses for Bad Behavior (Part One) (#40 Billboard Heatseekers Chart)
 I'm Still Here... Damn It!
 The Love Machine
 Hero Worship
 Excuses for Bad Behavior (Part Two)
 The Love Machine Remastered (entirely different from The Love Machine)
 Giving Til It Hurts
 Live and Beautiful (Promotional album sold at website sandrabernhard.com)
 Gems of Mystery
 Everything Bad & Beautiful
 Whatever It Takes
 I Love Being Me, Don't you? - featuring Carla Patullo (#9 Billboard Comedy Chart)

Singles
 "Everybody's Young"
 "You Make Me Feel (Mighty Real)" ( U.S. Billboard Hot Dance Club Play)
 "Manic Superstar"
 "Phone Sex (Do You Want Me Tonight?)"
 "On the Runway" ( U.S. Billboard Hot Dance Club Play)
 "Perfection"
 "Miracle of Lights"
 "All Around"

Compilations
 Stormy Weather; song "Is That All There Is?"
 Divas of Dance - Volume 3 (Remixes); song "You Make Me Feel (Mighty Real)"
 Breaking For the Holidays; song "Miracle of Lights"

Books
 Confessions of a Pretty Lady, an autobiography (HarperCollins October 1989 )
 Love, Love and Love, essay collection (HarperCollins June 1993 )
 May I Kiss You on the Lips, Miss Sandra?, semi-autobiography (HarperCollins October 1999 )''

Filmography

Film

Television

Short subjects

Awards

See also
 LGBT culture in New York City
 List of LGBT people from New York City

References

External links

 
 
 
 
 
 Bernhard's brief appearance in Philadelphia (video) 

1955 births
Actresses from Michigan
American Conservative Jews
American dance musicians
American women singers
American feminists
American film actresses
American stand-up comedians
American television actresses
Bisexual actresses
Bisexual comedians
Jewish American actresses
Jewish American female comedians
American LGBT rights activists
Living people
Writers from Flint, Michigan
Actresses from Scottsdale, Arizona
American women comedians
20th-century American actresses
21st-century American actresses
LGBT Jews
American voice actresses
Bisexual feminists
LGBT people from Arizona
LGBT people from Michigan
Jewish American musicians
American people of Romanian-Jewish descent
Feminist musicians
Sex-positive feminists
Actors from Flint, Michigan
20th-century American comedians
21st-century American comedians
Conservative Jewish feminists
American stage actresses
21st-century American Jews
American bisexual actors
Bisexual musicians
American LGBT musicians
American LGBT comedians